Goldsbrough Mort & Co was an Australian agricultural business.

History 
In 1843 Thomas Sutcliffe Mort established a business which operated as auctioneers and brokers in the wool trade. The business took on partners and become known as Mort & Co.

In 1847, Richard Goldsbrough founded a wool broking business in Melbourne.

In 1888, R Goldsbrough & Co merged with Mort & Co to form Goldsbrough Mort & Co.

In 1962 Goldsbrough, Mort & Co merged with Elder Smith & Co to form Elder Smith Goldsbrough Mort & Co Ltd.

In 1981 Elder Smith Goldsbrough Mort & Co Ltd merged with Henry Jones IXL to form Elders IXL which today trades as Elders Limited.

Goldsbrough Street in Fremantle, Western Australia, is named after the company because they owned property there. It runs between Elder Place (named after Elders Ltd.) and Cantonment Street.

Notable buildings 

Some of Goldsbrough Mort's buildings are now heritage listed, including:
 Goldsbrough Mort Woolstore, Brisbane
 Goldsbrough Mort Building, Rockhampton

References 

Australian stock and station agencies
Agriculture companies established in the 19th century
Agriculture companies disestablished in the 20th century
Australian companies established in 1888